Kugulta is the name of several rural localities in Russia:
Kugulta, Rostov Oblast, a khutor in Yulovskoye Rural Settlement of Tselinsky District of Rostov Oblast
Kugulta, Stavropol Krai, a selo in Kugultinsky Selsoviet of Grachyovsky District of Stavropol Krai